Hottot-les-Bagues is a commune in the Calvados department and Normandy region of north-western France.

Geography
Hottot-les-Bagues lies 14 kilometres south-east of Bayeux.

History
The fiefdom of Normandy was created for the Viking leader Rollo. Many of the remaining place names are of Norse origin. Hottot is believed to have taken its name from the Old Norse word haugr meaning mound or low hill.

During World War II, the Allied offensive in north-western Europe began with the Normandy landings of 6 June 1944. Within the surrounding district, there was much heavy fighting through June and July 1944 as Commonwealth forces tried to press on from Bayeux in an encircling movement to the south of Caen.

Military cemetery
Hottot-les-Bagues military cemetery contains some 1,137 graves belonging to 965 British soldiers, 34 Canadians, 3 Australians, 2 New Zealanders and 1 South African, together with 132 German soldiers. Most of the war dead lost their lives in the second fortnight of June 1944, in the furious fighting around Tilly-sur-Seulles. The cemetery can be reached from Bayeux by taking the D6 southeast. After passing through Tilly-sur-Seulles, turn westward at Juvigny onto the main road (the D9) that runs from Caen towards Caumont l'Evente.

Population

See also
Communes of the Calvados department
Duchy of Normandy
Battle for Caen

References

External links

Hottot les Bagues War Cemetery
Normandy War Cemeteries
 Vikings in Normandy

Communes of Calvados (department)
Calvados communes articles needing translation from French Wikipedia